Eudonia zhongdianensis is a moth in the family Crambidae. It was described by Wei-Chun Li, Hou-Hun Li and Matthias Nuss in 2012. It is found in Yunnan, China.

The length of the forewings is 8.5–9 mm. The forewings are covered with dense pale brown scales. The antemedian, postmedian and subterminal lines are white. The hindwings are greyish white, the apex and termen covered with pale brown scales.

Etymology
The species name refers to the type locality, Zhongdian County in Yunan Province.

References

Moths described in 2012
Eudonia